Littlestown is a borough in Adams County, Pennsylvania, United States. The population was 4,782 at the 2020 census.

Originally laid out by Peter Klein in 1760, the town was first named "Petersburg". German settlers in the area came to call the town "Kleine Stedtle". As confusion between the town and a neighboring town (also named "Petersburg", now York Springs) grew, the town officially changed its name to Littlestown (essentially a translation of "Kleine Stedtle" from German) in 1795.

Geography
Littlestown is located at  (39.743749, -77.089240). Littlestown is surrounded by three larger towns, Hanover and Gettysburg in Pennsylvania and Westminster, Maryland, all within  driving distance.

Demographics

As of the census of 2000, there were 3,947 people, 1,586 households, and 1,113 families residing in the borough. The population density was 2,517.0 people per square mile (970.7/km²). There were 1,692 housing units at an average density of 1,079.0 per square mile (416.1/km²). The racial makeup of the borough was 97.26% White, 0.56% African American, 0.10% Native American, 0.43% Asian, 0.51% from other races, and 1.14% from two or more races. Hispanic or Latino of any race were 1.27% of the population.

There were 1,586 households, out of which 35.9% had children under the age of 18 living with them, 53.3% were married couples living together, 12.7% had a female householder with no husband present, and 29.8% were non-families. 24.8% of all households were made up of individuals, and 10.5% had someone living alone who was 65 years of age or older. The average household size was 2.49 and the average family size was 2.95.

In the borough, the population was spread out, with 27.7% under the age of 18, 7.6% from 18 to 24, 32.1% from 25 to 44, 18.5% from 45 to 64, and 14.1% who were 65 years of age or older. The median age was 34 years. For every 100 females there were 90.5 males. For every 100 females age 18 and over, there were 84.6 males. The median income for a household in the borough was $36,678, and the median income for a family was $42,261. Males had a median income of $31,055 versus $23,658 for females. The per capita income for the borough was $17,310. About 6.9% of families and 10.0% of the population were below the poverty line, including 12.2% of those under age 18 and 8.7% of those age 65 or over.

While the agricultural past of the town is still clear, it has begun to become a bedroom community for commuters working in Baltimore, Harrisburg and York.

Public schools

There are three branches of the school district: 

 Alloway Creek Elementary (K–5th), 
 Maple Avenue Middle School (grades 6 to 8), 
 Littlestown High School (grades 9 to 12), home of the Thunderbolts.

Recreation and parks
The borough contains Littlestown Community Park, Crouse Park, and the Littlestown Community Pool.

Notable people

 George Peter Deisert, fraktur artist
 Congressman Joseph A. Goulden
 Congressman James McSherry
 Stage actress/writer/dancer Myrtle Louise Stonesifer- King
 Escaped slave James W. C. Pennington

References

American Civil War sites
Populated places established in 1765
Boroughs in Adams County, Pennsylvania
Pennsylvania in the American Civil War
1864 establishments in Pennsylvania